As the Flower Withers is the debut studio album by Yorkshire-based doom metal band My Dying Bride. The artwork was designed by Dave McKean. This is the only full-length My Dying Bride album on which lead vocalist Aaron Stainthorpe utilizes his death growl as the sole vocal style.

Song information
Many of the tracks on this album have appeared in a different form on other My Dying Bride releases. "Sear Me" was the first in a trilogy of songs to bear the title, followed by the keyboard- and violin-only "Sear Me MCMXCIII" in 1993 and "Sear Me III" in 1999, which is more similar in style to the original, being a full band composition.
"The Bitterness and the Bereavement" evolved from an earlier demo, which was released independently as "Unreleased Bitterness" in 1993. This version of the song also appears on the digipak re-release of As the Flower Withers, and on the rarities/best-of compilation Meisterwerk 1. "Vast Choirs" is a reworked version of the version that appears on the band's first recording, Towards the Sinister. This version is widely available on both Meisterwerk 2 and the 2004 reissue of Trinity. "The Return of the Beautiful" was re-recorded for 2001's The Dreadful Hours, with its title being slightly changed to "The Return to the Beautiful". Live versions of "The Forever People" can be found on the limited edition versions of The Angel and the Dark River and For Darkest Eyes. This song is often played as the last song of the set in many of the band's live shows.

Track listing

Personnel
 Aaron Stainthorpe - vocals
 Andrew Craighan - guitar
 Calvin Robertshaw - guitar
 Adrian Jackson - bass
 Rick Miah - drums

Additional personnel
 Martin Powell - session violin
 Wolfgang Bremmer - session horn
 Dave McKean - cover photography, illustration and design
 Noel Summerville - mastering (at Transfermation, London)

References 

1992 debut albums
My Dying Bride albums
Albums with cover art by Dave McKean